Choanephora is a genus of Zygomycota fungi. Choanephora species are known as plant pathogens.

References

External links 
 Index Fungorum
 Choanephora at Zygomycetes.org

Zygomycota genera
Fungal plant pathogens and diseases